Danielle Jane "Dannii" Minogue (born 20 October 1971) is an Australian singer, television personality, and actress. She gained recognition for her appearances on the television show Young Talent Time (1982–1988) and for her role as Emma Jackson on the soap opera Home and Away (1989–1990). Minogue began her music career in the early 1990s, achieving early success with her debut studio album, Love and Kisses (1991); the album was certified gold by the British Phonographic Industry (BPI) and included the hit singles "Love and Kisses", "Baby Love", "Jump to the Beat" and "Success". Following the release of her second album, Get into You (1993), Minogue's popularity as a singer had declined, leading her to make a name for herself with award-winning performances in theatre productions.

The late 1990s saw a brief return to music after Minogue reinvented herself as a dance artist with her third album, Girl (1997), and its lead single "All I Wanna Do". Her fourth album, Neon Nights (2003), became the most successful of her career and spawned the hit singles "Who Do You Love Now?", "I Begin to Wonder", "Put the Needle on It", and "Don't Wanna Lose This Feeling". In 2007, she released her fifth album, Club Disco. In the UK, Minogue has achieved nine UK Top 10 singles and 13 consecutive number-one dance singles, becoming the best-performing artist on the UK Dance Chart. In Australia, she has achieved twelve Top 30 singles and six Gold certified singles. As of January 2017, she has sold over eight million records worldwide.

Minogue has served as a judge on multiple television talent shows, including The X Factor UK (2007–2010), Australia's Got Talent (2007–2012), Britain & Ireland's Next Top Model (2013), The X Factor Australia (2013–2015), Let It Shine (2017), and The Masked Singer Australia (2019–2021). She starred in her own reality series Style Queen (2010), and has presented the television shows It's Not Just Saturday (1996), Dance Boss (2018), and Ultimate Beastmaster (2018).

Early life and career beginnings
Danielle Jane Minogue was brought up in Surrey Hills, Melbourne and attended Camberwell Primary School and later Camberwell High School. She is the younger daughter of Carol Ann Jones, a dancer from Maesteg, Wales, and accountant Ronald Charles Minogue. She is the youngest of three children; her older sister is singer Kylie Minogue, while her brother Brendan is a news cameraman in Australia.

Minogue began her career as a child on Australian television. From the age of 7, she appeared in several soap operas, including Skyways and The Sullivans. In 1982, she joined the weekly music programme Young Talent Time. Minogue recorded her first solo recordings for the programme, including a cover version of Madonna's hit single "Material Girl"; during this time, she also performed live at several sold-out nationwide concert tours. In 1988, Minogue departed from Young Talent Time to continue her acting career, appearing as the rebellious tomboyish teenager Emma Jackson on the soap opera Home and Away in 1989. Minogue remained on the programme for only a year. She proved to be popular among Australian audiences when she was nominated for a Silver Logie as the Most Popular Actress on Australian television.

In September 1988, Minogue released her own fashion range, Dannii. She became interested in fashion design while appearing on Young Talent Time. Minogue had designed the clothing she had worn on the show, and the positive response from the audience resulted in her releasing her own line. Minogue's debut line Dannii sold out across Australia in ten days and was followed by three additional summer lines in 1989.

Music career

1990–1995: Dannii and Get into You
Minogue signed a recording contract with Australian-based Mushroom Records in January 1989. Her first album, Dannii, was released the following year and reached number twenty-four on the Australian albums chart. Outside Australia, the album was released in 1991 under the title Love and Kisses and peaked at number eight in the United Kingdom and was certified gold. Minogue's debut single "Love and Kisses" peaked at number four on the Australian singles chart and was certified gold. In the UK, the song peaked at number eight on the singles chart. Subsequent singles "Success", "Jump to the Beat", "Baby Love" and "I Don't Wanna Take This Pain" all reached the UK top 40.

Minogue released Love and Kisses and..., a re-issue of her debut album, in November 1991. The album, a collection of dance songs, comprised tracks and remixes from Love and Kisses. It peaked at number 42 on the UK albums chart and sold nearly 60,000 copies in its own right. Several remixes by producer and DJ Steve "Silk" Hurley were successful in European dance clubs. She credits these remixes for providing her with a "new image and sound to work with" on future releases. Also that year, Minogue made her feature film debut in Secrets, which co-starred Noah Taylor. The film revolved around five Australian teenagers who become stuck in the basement of a hotel in an attempt to see The Beatles. The film was not well received by audiences or critics, with Minogue's performance being described as "not all that convincing".

Minogue released her second album Get into You, which included the songs "Show You the Way to Go", "This Is It" and "This Is the Way", in October 1993. The album contained uptempo dance tracks, but despite her past chart success, failed to make the British top fifty. In mid-1994, Minogue returned to television as a presenter, co-hosting Channel 4's morning show The Big Breakfast in the UK. In 1995, Minogue released the singles "Rescue Me" and "Boogie Woogie", a collaboration with dance act Eurogroove. Released only in Japan, both songs reached number one on the Japanese singles chart. She began recording her third album in 1995; however, Minogue and her record label, Mushroom Records, parted ways in late 1995 following a contract disagreement.
The tracks recorded in 1994/1995 for Minogue's planned third album were unheard for many years, they were finally released in 2009 via Cargo Records on the compilation album The 1995 Sessions.

In 1991, Minogue appeared before the Queen at the Royal Variety Show where she sang "Success".

1996–2004: Girl and Neon Nights
In 1996, Minogue resumed her co-hosting duties, presenting the Eggs on Legs road show segment. That same year, Minogue briefly hosted the children's show Disney Time and co-hosted, with Gareth Jones, the teenage Saturday morning entertainment show It's Not Just Saturday for 16. In 1997, Minogue hosted Top of the Pops, a British music chart television programme, before returning to her recording career later that year. In April 1997, Minogue made her stage debut as Rizzo in the musical Grease: The Arena Spectacular. In Australia, the show sold over 450,000 tickets during its first season. The following year, Minogue resumed her role as Rizzo, performing in New Zealand. At the 1998 Mo Awards, Minogue was nominated for "Best Female Musical Theater Performer" for her role.

Following the release of several remixes of her songs by Steve "Silk" Hurley, Minogue became interested in dance music. She commented that the remixes were "the first thing I did that was really cool and my love of dance music and clubbing started from there." Minogue's interest in dance music and clubbing influenced her third album, Girl, released in September 1997, which featured collaborations with musicians such as Brian Higgins of Xenomania. The album presented a more sophisticated and adult style of dance music, but despite generally positive reviews, failed to make the British top 50. The lead single "All I Wanna Do", which the Daily Mirror described as a "bass-bumping, shuddering return", peaked at number four on the UK singles chart. In her native Australia, the single peaked at number eleven and was certified gold. The album's second single "Everything I Wanted" made the top 20 in the UK and the top 50 in Australia, while the third single "Disremembrance" narrowly missed the top 20 in the UK, peaking at number 21. All three singles released from Girl reached number one on the UK dance chart.

In June 1998, Minogue began The Unleashed Tour, a 22-date UK tour. Mushroom Records released two budget compilation albums in December 1998, as part of the label's 25th anniversary. Released only in Australia, The Singles comprised all Minogue's single releases, while The Remixes contained popular remixes. These releases were promoted with the song "Coconut", which was previously only available as a hidden track on CD versions of the Girl album. In January 1999, following her performance at the 1998 Sydney Gay and Lesbian Mardi Gras, Minogue released the festival's first official theme song, "Everlasting Night". It appeared on the compilation CD Gay & Lesbian Mardi Gras of 1999 and its music video, co-directed by Minogue, was a tribute to Australia's gay and lesbian community.

In November 2001, Minogue released the single, "Who Do You Love Now?", a collaboration with Riva. Described by Sound Generator as a "nice serene and dreamy vocal on the dance floor anthem", the song peaked at number three on the UK singles chart and reached number one on the dance charts. In Australia, the song peaked at number 15, while in the United States the song was released to dance clubs and reached number 12 on the US Billboard Dance Club chart. In 2001, Minogue signed a six-album deal with London Records, a subsidiary of Warner Music International.

In March 2003, Minogue released her fourth album, Neon Nights, which the BBC called "a pleasant cocktail of pop sophistication, club culture and accessibility". It consisted of 1980s inspired dance-pop songs and provided Minogue with some of the strongest reviews of her career. Neon Nights peaked at number eight on the UK albums chart (her highest ranking since her debut) and produced four top 10 singles. "Who Do You Love Now?" was not officially released as the first single; however, it was included on the album. The official lead single was "Put the Needle on It", a 1980s inspired dance-pop song which became a top 10 hit in the UK, peaking at number seven. It enjoyed top 20 success in several countries including Australia, where it peaked at number 11 and was certified gold. The second single, "I Begin to Wonder", was declared one of the "best things" on the album by Ireland's Radio Telefís Éireann and became her highest-charting single in the UK, peaking at number two. In Australia, the single garnered Minogue another top 20 hit, peaking at number 14 and was also certified gold. Third single "Don't Wanna Lose This Feeling" reached number five in the UK, while in Australia the single just missed the top 20, charting at number 22. Following extensive airplay by North American dance radio, Warner Music Group released the album in the United States in late 2003. Singles "I Begin to Wonder" and "Don't Wanna Lose This Feeling" were also substantial successes on the US dance charts.

2004–2006: The Hits & Beyond
In June 2004, Afterlife released the album Speck of Gold, which featured Minogue on the single "Take Me Inside". The album was released in Australia in 2008, featuring two different versions of the song.

In October 2004, Minogue released the single "You Won't Forget About Me", a collaboration with the dance act Flower Power. Described by MSN Entertainment as a "real grower" and noted for its "snip snapping house beats and '80s flecked synths", the song peaked at number seven on the UK singles chart and also made the top 20 in Australia. "Perfection", a collaboration with the Soul Seekerz, followed in October 2005 where it reached the top twenty in both the UK and Australia.

Minogue released The Hits & Beyond, a greatest hits album, in June 2006. The album consisted of new songs alongside singles from her four studio albums. It debuted at number 17 on the UK Albums Chart. The album introduced a new single, "So Under Pressure", inspired by the cancer diagnoses of her sister Kylie as well as that of an unnamed friend. On 11 December Minogue performed "Kids" with her sister Kylie during Showgirl: The Homecoming Tour in Melbourne and "Celebration" on 31 December in London at Wembley Arena. The single made the top 20 in Australia and the UK and also became her 10th consecutive song to reach the number one spot on the UK Upfront Club chart. Minogue has described the recording of "So Under Pressure" as a "real achievement" as she was "brave enough to put all [her feelings] into words". In September 2006, Minogue's cover of "I'll Be Home for Christmas" appeared on Spirit of Christmas, a compilation album of holiday songs available through the Myer department store chain across Australia.

In November 2006, Minogue performed Sister Sledge's 1979 song "He's the Greatest Dancer" on BBC One's Children in Need telethon. A studio version of the song, remixed by Fugitive, appeared on the dance compilation Clubland 10, which was released in November 2006. The following month, "He's the Greatest Dancer" was released to UK dance clubs and reached number one on the Upfront Club chart. It also charted in the top 40 on the Australian singles chart.

2007–2010: Unleashed and Club Disco

October onwards saw a total of five releases from Minogue; first, on 29 October, reissues of her 1997 and 2003 albums Girl and Neon Nights, each containing two discs, the second disc of which includes remixes. On 5 November, she released Unleashed, a collection of previously unheard material from her time with London Records, and The Video Collection, which includes every one of her music videos as well as bonus features. Minogue's fifth studio album Club Disco was released on the same date and in May 2008 in Australia, featuring several previously released singles, such as "You Won't Forget About Me", "Perfection", and "So Under Pressure", cancelled single "I Can't Sleep at Night" and covers of "Xanadu" and the disco classic "He's the Greatest Dancer". Finally, on 3 December, a single was released, titled "Touch Me Like That", which peaked at number one on the UK Dance Chart.

In early 2008, Minogue was hired as the headline performer at Australian Fashion Week. In particular, she was booked to make an appearance at the opening party hosted by MAC Cosmetics. She also released Club Disco as a double album in Australia with some changes to the track listing. At the start of 2009, a digital compilation album, The Early Years, was released online that featured songs from Minogue's first two studio albums.

On 7 December 2009, Minogue released The 1995 Sessions, an album full of previously unreleased recordings made for what would have been her then third studio album, which never materialised due to differences with her then label. On the same date, Minogue re-released remastered editions of her first two albums with MCA Records, her debut Love & Kisses and the follow-up Get into You. In total Minogue's music has achieved more than 200 weeks on the UK Sales Chart and she has sold more than seven-million records worldwide. On 23 June 2010, ITV2 announced Dannii Minogue: Style Queen, a three-part documentary about Minogue's fashion line "Project D", The X Factor, motherhood, her partner Kris Smith and her return to music as well as writing her autobiography My Story, which was produced by Steve Vizard and broadcast in Australia on Foxtel.

2011–present: This Is It: The Very Best Of, Summer of Love and Holding On

In January 2012, Minogue appeared in the ITV documentary The Talent Show Story where she talked about her time on The X Factor UK and working on talent shows. Other talent show judges interviewed included Gary Barlow, Louis Walsh, Kelly Rowland, Tulisa, Amanda Holden, Piers Morgan, Carrie Grant and Simon Cowell, as well as The X Factor host Dermot O'Leary and Britain's Got Talent hosts Ant & Dec. In February 2012, Minogue officially opened Madame Tussauds Sydney, unveiling a waxwork of herself at the launch.

In September 2013, Minogue teamed up with Ronan Keating to record a duet of the Christmas classic "Santa Claus Is Coming to Town" for department store chain Myer's The Spirit of Christmas 2013 compilation. In late 2014, Minogue recorded a cover version of "That's How You Know" for the Australian We Love Disney album.

In February 2015, Minogue announced that, after a long hiatus, she planned to make her musical comeback at the Sydney Gay and Lesbian Mardi Gras. Minogue also revealed she had been working on new music. Following the announcement, Minogue, British rapper Reece Robertson and the official Sydney Mardi Gras profiles launched a mysterious online campaign on social media featuring the #pressplay hashtag. At the end of February, Sydney Mardi Gras shared a YouTube link to a video called #pressplay featuring the extended mix of "Summer of Love". On 2 March, the extended mix of "Summer of Love" was made available to pre-order on iTunes.

In August 2017, Minogue confirmed that she would be a support act for Take That on their first Australian tour in over twenty years, which would take place that November. She also announced a single titled "Holding On" would be released on 11 August and that more new music would be released around the time of the tour. On 2 November 2017, Minogue confirmed she would release a song titled "Galaxy" on 10 November, a day before the tour was due to start.

Television career

UK television
In 2007, Minogue became a judge on the fourth series of The X Factor UK, alongside Simon Cowell, Louis Walsh and Sharon Osbourne. She mentored the Boys category and selected Leon Jackson, Rhydian Roberts and Andy Williams to represent her in the live rounds of the competition. Ultimately, two of her chosen acts, Roberts and Jackson, became the final two, with Jackson eventually becoming the winner after topping the public vote. Minogue was the first female judge to win the show. On 20 September 2008, Minogue presented the Nickelodeon UK Kids' Choice Awards ceremony. That same year, Minogue returned to the show's fifth series alongside Cowell, Walsh and Cheryl Cole, who replaced Osbourne. Following the initial auditions and boot camp stages of the competition, Minogue was assigned the Over 25s category to mentor. She chose Daniel Evans, Rachel Hylton and Ruth Lorenzo as her final three contestants for the live shows and was assisted by Spice Girls member Emma Bunton. In the quarter-final, Minogue lost her final act as Lorenzo was eliminated from the competition finishing in fifth place, leaving her without a contestant in the semi-final.

Throughout the fifth series, several people in the entertainment industry, including Ronan Keating, Noel Gallagher and Graham Norton questioned Minogue's judging credentials and mentoring ability. On 22 November 2008, during a live broadcast of the programme, Minogue broke down in tears and was unable to introduce one of her acts, Rachel Hylton, following an on-air row with Louis Walsh over a choice of song. Despite the controversies, she proved popular in public votes and polls. Minogue later stated that she did not enjoy her experience on the fifth series and "would never want to go through that again". Minogue returned for the sixth series in 2009 and mentored the Girls category. She chose Rachel Adedeji, Lucie Jones and Stacey Solomon as her final three acts to compete in the live shows and was assisted at the judges' houses stage by her older sister, Kylie Minogue. Despite losing Adedeji in week 4 and Jones the following week, Solomon went on to advance into the final and ultimately finish in third place. In 2010, Minogue was pregnant. She later stated that, as her baby's expected arrival in July would clash with filming for The X Factor audition dates, she would be unable to judge in the audition episodes for the seventh series. Minogue returned during the judges' houses stage. She mentored the Boys category selecting Nicolo Festa, Matt Cardle and Aiden Grimshaw as her final three, with Paije Richardson as her wildcard act. Minogue was assisted by fellow Australian and friend Natalie Imbruglia who was a guest judge in the Birmingham auditions that year filling in for Minogue. Cardle was her only act to make it into the final and eventually won, with Minogue becoming the winning mentor for the second time.

On 14 May 2011, it was announced that Minogue would not be returning for the eighth series of The X Factor UK. Of her decision, Minogue said "During discussions for me to return (to The X Factor) it became clear that unfortunately, this year, the X Factor audition dates in the UK clash with the live shows of Australia's Got Talent during June and July. For this reason I am unable to return." She was replaced by Kelly Rowland. In January 2012, Minogue appeared on the ITV documentary The Talent Show Story where she talked about her time on The X Factor and working on talent shows. Other The X Factor judges who were interviewed included Gary Barlow, Walsh, Tulisa, Rowland and Simon Cowell as well as the host Dermot O'Leary. In June 2013, Minogue joined Elle Macpherson and Tyson Beckford on the judging panel for the ninth series of Sky Living's Britain & Ireland's Next Top Model. She replaced Whitney Port and Julien McDonald.

In September 2016, it was revealed Minogue was returning to British television, as a judge on the judging panel of Gary Barlow talent show Let It Shine alongside fellow judges Martin Kemp and Barlow.

Australian television

In 2007, Minogue was hired by Simon Cowell to become a judge on the Seven Network talent show Australia's Got Talent along with Red Symons and Tom Burlinson. It was after this series that Minogue was offered the role on The X Factor UK after Cowell thought she proved good as a judge on Australia's Got Talent. She returned to the panel for seasons two and three in 2008 and 2009. Australia's Got Talent returned for a fourth season in 2010, and Minogue was the only original judge to remain on the panel as producers revamped the series. Brian McFadden and Kyle Sandilands took the places of Red Symons and Tom Burlinson. Minogue also returned for the fifth season in 2011 and the sixth season in 2012. In November 2012, it was announced that Minogue would not be returning for the seventh season in an attempt to reboot the show. She was replaced by Geri Halliwell in the Nine Network's version of the show.

In 2013, Minogue joined the judging panel of the fifth season of The X Factor Australia as Mel B's replacement. She joined returning judges Ronan Keating and Natalie Bassingthwaighte and fellow new judge Redfoo, who replaced Guy Sebastian. Minogue mentored the Over 24s category and one of her acts Dami Im became the winner. Minogue reprised her judging role for the sixth season in 2014. She mentored the Groups category and one of her acts Brothers3 placed third in the competition. Minogue returned for the seventh season in 2015 for the final time as a judge where she mentored the Girls Category and ended up losing all of her acts by the 7th week of the show. She was replaced by Iggy Azalea.

In 2019, she was announced as one of the judges on the Australian version of The Masked Singer alongside Jackie O, Dave Hughes and Lindsay Lohan. Minogue returned for the second season alongside Jackie O and Hughes, and new judge Urzila Carlson who replaced Lohan. All judges returned for the third season in 2021. However, in June 2022, it was announced that Minogue, Jackie O and Carlson would not be returning to the judging panel for the fourth season. It was later announced that Minogue departed the show because she was busy filming a new show in the UK. She was replaced by international pop singer Mel B.

Other ventures

Theatre productions
In 1999, Minogue returned to theatre, starring in the production of Shakespeare's Macbeth at the Edinburgh Fringe Festival. The play received mixed reviews; critic Matt Grant wrote that Minogue "lacks true conviction as she ploughs through the lines without capturing their full force", while Fiachra Gibbons singled Minogue's performance out, noting in her review that Minogue's "disco-queen-from-hell delivery works well" for her character, Lady Macbeth. Two years later, Minogue appeared as Esmeralda in the musical production of Notre-Dame de Paris in London's West End. The musical received poor reviews from British critics who called it "lame" and its songs "reminiscent of [the] Eurovision song contest". At the 2002 Maxim Awards, she won "Best Stage Performance" for her role. In 2001, Minogue also appeared in the stage play The Vagina Monologues, which co-starred Kika Markham and Meera Syal.

Radio
In June 2003, Minogue hosted her own radio programme, Dannii Minogue's Neon Nights. Broadcast in Australia and the UK, Minogue played songs by up-and-coming DJs, as well as her own music. Minogue departed London Records when Warner (its parent owner) dismissed its staff and offered Minogue a deal to depart the label or stay and wait a year to release her next album which had been partially recorded. Minogue collaborated with producers Hugo Lira, Gareth Young, Ian Masterson, Ross Callum and Pascal Gabriel. Many of these tracks were later released on the album "Unleashed". Later that year she signed a new contract with independent dance label All Around the World Records.

Fashion

In the late 1980s, Minogue had a fashion range that she designed which was sold in Target Australia.

Since joining The X Factor and Australia's Got Talent in 2007, Minogue has become a Style Icon in Australia, Ireland and the United Kingdom, receiving critical acclaim from various fashion designers such as Victoria Beckham and wearing dresses from J'Aton Couture, Antonio Berardi, Dolce & Gabbana, Marchesa, Philip Armstrong, Carla Zampatti, Gucci and Aurelio Costarella and has featured on fashion magazines like Cosmopolitan, InStyle and Vogue. The press in Britain have especially taken notice of her sense of fashion and different hairstyles since Cheryl Cole joined The X Factor in 2008 often comparing both of them. The praise Minogue got from the tabloids on The X Factor led her to set up her own fashion label with Tabitha Somerset-Webb called Project D, as well as a fragrance. The first line of Project D was sold exclusively by Selfridges in the United Kingdom, the Spring/Summer line was showcased by Minogue during the live first Sunday night show of The X Factor Season 7, wearing her Jingle prom-style dress. In August 2012, the label was rebranded and relaunched as Project D London. In May 2013, Minogue announced that she would no longer be associated with Project D, ending a three-year collaboration with Somerset-Webb.

In late July 2011, it was announced that Minogue would serve as the ambassador for 2011's Melbourne Spring Fashion Week, a role that will see Minogue participate in a series of appearances in September.

In 2014 Minogue continued her expansion into the fashion world by launching her own ecommerce store fashion saga. In addition, Minogue announced the launch of her petite clothing line through Target Australia. To date, Minogue has released six Dannii For Target Petites Collection ranges along with a range of shoes and accessories.

Endorsements
Minogue has been a global ambassador for Etihad Airways since 2008.

It was confirmed that Minogue would be one of the new faces of Marks and Spencer. She filmed her first commercial in South Africa, which featured Cheryl Lynn's "Got to be Real", for their Spring campaign that aired 24 March 2010. She starred alongside Twiggy, Lisa Snowdon, VV Brown and Ana Beatriz Barros. Minogue didn't feature in the Autumn ad due to her pregnancy, she did feature in the Christmas ad with Peter Kay which featured the Bee Gees' "You Should Be Dancing".

Minogue travelled to Miami, Florida in January 2011 to shoot the commercial for M&S for the 2011 Spring collection.

Minogue is a former face of world-famous cosmetics brand ModelCo, appearing in ad campaigns for the company.

On 5 April 2015 Minogue was announced as the 2015 Style Ambassador for Westfield Australia.

In January 2017, Minogue was announced as an Ambassador for L'Oréal Australia.

Writing 
In 2010, Minogue released her autobiography book, My Story. The following year she released a fashion book titled My Style.

Personal life

Relationships
In January 1994, Minogue married actor Julian McMahon, whom she met in 1990 while working on the television series Home and Away. McMahon is the son of the former Prime Minister of Australia Sir William McMahon and Lady McMahon. Minogue and McMahon were married for less than two years and divorced in 1995. Minogue stated that McMahon's mother, Lady Sonia McMahon threatened not to attend their wedding and caused a rift. In October 1995, Minogue posed nude in the Australian edition of Playboy. Commenting on the reason she posed nude, Minogue said she "just had a marriage break-up. Most women go to the hairdressers – I did Playboy. I chose the photographer, the location, what I did or didn't want to wear, and everything else about the pictures. I found it a really liberating, empowering experience."

In October 1999, Minogue became engaged to 1997 Formula 1 World Champion Jacques Villeneuve (son of Ferrari Formula 1 great Gilles Villeneuve), but their relationship ended in 2001.

In early 2002, she began dating music producer and Bros bassist Craig Logan, whom she met while recording material for Neon Nights. Media reports in March 2002 claimed Minogue and Logan were engaged, but in December 2002 they ended their relationship.

In August 2008, Minogue began dating English model and former professional rugby league player Kris Smith. They met in Ibiza, where Smith was celebrating in his 30th birthday. On 9 January 2010, it was announced that Minogue was pregnant; the news was revealed after receiving her 12-week scan. Minogue gave birth via caesarean section to an 8 lb 3oz/4 kg boy, at Royal Women's Hospital in Melbourne, Victoria, Australia on 5 July 2010. She had previously planned for a home birth. In April 2012, Minogue announced on Twitter that she and Smith had separated.

Controversies
In 2002, the British National Party (BNP), a far-right and anti-immigration political party, falsely claimed that Minogue supported their cause following comments she had made in an interview with Britain's GQ. In the interview, Minogue was quoted saying that French National Front leader Jean-Marie Le Pen had "struck a chord with people". Minogue responded saying that she had been misquoted and was "mortified" to be associated with the party adding that "Australia is the most multicultural melting pot of people. I'm completely proud of that." Minogue responded to the British National Party's claims in Gay Times magazine saying, "I am not a racist. That is not how I live my life. I have a Jewish manager, I perform in gay clubs, I come from a multicultural background and I am very proud of that."

Minogue received much criticism during series 6 of The X Factor. Controversy began after the first live show on 10 October, after Minogue commented on press reports stating that Danyl Johnson was bisexual. After his performance of "And I Am Telling You I'm Not Going", in which he had changed the gender of the person being addressed in the song from male to female, Minogue remarked to Johnson on air that he didn't need to change the gender if the press was to be believed. Minogue's remarks sparked an online backlash. Minogue released a statement on the issue:

I want to clear up exactly what happened on last night's X Factor show and post my sincere apologies to anyone who took offence. I made a comment about Danyl changing the lyrics of his song. It was meant to be a humorous moment about the fact he has an opportunity to have fun with his song. An openly bisexual singing a song that is lyrically a 'girl's song'. Danyl and I were joking about the very same thing in rehearsals on Friday, so it carried on to the show. I'd like to apologise to anyone that was offended by my comments, it was never my intention. I spoke to Danyl straight after the show last night and he wasn't offended or upset by my comments, and knew exactly what I was saying.

Minogue also apologised on the live results show on 11 October, saying Johnson was not upset by her comments. It has since been reported that British regulator Ofcom received around 4,000 complaints from viewers over the comment. As a result, Ofcom launched an investigation, which cleared Minogue and The X Factor. No penalties were imposed.

Media portrayal and other activities
Throughout her career, Minogue has often been compared with her sister, Kylie, whose career has been considerably more successful. Referring to the comparison, Minogue said: "[I]t is hard to be compared all the time to Kylie. On the other hand, however, people will always try to compare you to somebody. Look at Britney and Christina." In an interview with Elle in April 2009, Kylie criticised X Factor judge Louis Walsh for his jibes at her sister: "I'm so proud of my sister and it annoys the hell out of me when comparisons between us are made. In England you lot don't know where she came from. She was on TV every week from 7 years old. It makes it harder for her when she gets Louis Walsh's rather pathetic jibes – one of which is she hasn't had a hit record and that's just not true." She also denied rumours that she did not get along with Cheryl Cole and that she had referred to former judge Sharon Osbourne as "so cheap".

Minogue has performed multiple times at the Sydney Gay and Lesbian Mardi Gras and the London nightclub G-A-Y. She credits her gay following for much of her success, commenting that gay culture has "always been a part of [her] music". Minogue openly supports gay rights causes for social equality and believes that same-sex marriages should be accepted by all governments.

Minogue is an ambassador for the Terrence Higgins Trust, an organisation that works to increase awareness of AIDS. She joined the charity in hope that her endorsement would encourage people to discuss safe sex and the disease more openly. In 2004 she posed nude, wrapped only in a red ribbon, to promote World AIDS Day in Australia and the UK. She has long been a supporter of breast cancer research and in August 2008 became an ambassador for the Olivia Newton-John Cancer and Wellness Centre Appeal.

Discography 

Dannii / Love and Kisses (1991)
Get into You (1993)
Girl (1997)
Neon Nights (2003)
Club Disco (2007)

Filmography

Television

Film

DVDs

Bibliography 
 My Story (autobiography book) (2010)
My Style (fashion book) (2011)

Awards and recognition

References

External links

 
1971 births
Australian people of English descent
Australian people of Irish descent
Australian people of Welsh descent
20th-century Australian actresses
21st-century Australian actresses
Actresses from Melbourne
Australian child actresses
Australian dance musicians
Australian expatriates in England
Australian film actresses
Australian house musicians
Australian television actresses
Australian disco musicians
Nu-disco musicians
People associated with Solent University
Singers from Melbourne
Living people
Australian women pop singers
Australian child singers
20th-century Australian women singers
21st-century Australian women singers
Racing drivers' wives and girlfriends
Australian women singer-songwriters
All Around the World Productions artists
Musicians from Melbourne
People from Surrey Hills, Victoria